The Great American Songbook is a studio album by Australian jazz musician, James Morrison with the BBC Concert Orchestra and Keith Lockhart. The album was released on 2 June 2017. 

At the ARIA Music Awards of 2017, the album won the ARIA Award for Best Jazz Album.

Track listing
 "I've Got the World on a String" - 6:25
 "It Don't Mean a Thing (If It Ain't Got That Swing)" - 4:42
 "Love Is a Many-Splendored Thing" - 7:29
 "A Foggy Day (In London Town)" - 5:30
 "Our Love Is Here to Stay" - 3:55
 "Summertime" - 5:44
 "They Can't Take That Away from Me" - 7:23
 "Tenderly" - 2:36
 "The Way You Look Tonight" - 5:17
 "A Time for Love" - 5:47
 "The Shadow of Your Smile" - 6:00
 "Ev'ry Time We Say Goodbye" - 5:04
 "My Funny Valentine" - 3:27

References

2017 albums
ARIA Award-winning albums
Jazz albums by Australian artists